Gavin Scott Williams (born July 26, 1999) is an American professional baseball pitcher in the Cleveland Guardians organization.

Amateur career
Williams attended Cape Fear High School in Fayetteville, North Carolina. As a senior in 2017, he threw two consecutive no-hitters after returning to play after undergoing surgery on a torn meniscus. He ended his senior year 6–1 with a 0.35 ERA over 39 innings. He was selected by the Tampa Bay Rays in the 30th round of the 2017 Major League Baseball draft, but did not sign, instead enrolling at East Carolina University.

In 2018, as a freshman at East Carolina, Williams missed time due to a forearm strain but still compiled a 1.15 ERA over  innings. After the 2018 season, he played collegiate summer baseball with the Bourne Braves of the Cape Cod Baseball League. As a sophomore in 2019, he appeared in 21 games (five starts), going 1–4 with a 4.56 ERA over  innings. In 2020, he pitched three innings before the college baseball season was cancelled due to the COVID-19 pandemic. He was considered a top prospect for the 2020 Major League Baseball draft, but went unselected. Williams moved into the starting rotation for the 2021 season. He missed the beginning of the year with a minor injury but still appeared in 15 games (making 12 starts), going 10–1 with a 1.88 ERA with 130 strikeouts over  innings. He was named the American Athletic Conference Pitcher of the Year alongside earning 2021 College Baseball All-America Team honors.

Professional career
Williams was selected by the Cleveland Indians in the first round with the 23rd overall selection of the 2021 Major League Baseball draft. He signed for $2.25 million. 

Williams was assigned to the Lake County Captains of the High-A Midwest League to make his professional debut and begin the 2022 season. After nine starts in which he went 2-1 with a 1.40 ERA and 67 strikeouts over 45 innings, he was promoted to the Akron RubberDucks of the Double-A Eastern League. Over 16 starts with Akron, he posted a 3-3 record with a 2.31 ERA and 82 strikeouts over seventy innings.

References

External links

East Carolina Pirates bio

1999 births
Living people
All-American college baseball players
Baseball players from North Carolina
Baseball pitchers
Bourne Braves players
East Carolina Pirates baseball players
Lake County Captains players
Akron RubberDucks players